Las Perdices is a city located in the Tercero Arriba Department in the Province of Córdoba in central Argentina.

References

Populated places in Córdoba Province, Argentina
Populated places established in 1887
1887 establishments in Argentina